Emma Bosch Castell (Sabadell, 22 February 1971 – Sabadell, 26 March 1994) was a Spanish former alpine skier who competed in the 1992 Winter Olympics. She retired from alpine skiing in February 1994 due to a knee injury sustained two years before. On 26 March 1994 in the morning, Bosch had an epileptic seizure at her home in Sabadell, which resulted in a head injury of which she died the same day.

References

1971 births
1994 deaths
Spanish female alpine skiers
Olympic alpine skiers of Spain
Alpine skiers at the 1992 Winter Olympics
Skiers from Catalonia
Deaths from epilepsy
Deaths from head injury